is a former Japanese football player He is the current assistant manager J2 League club of Renofa Yamaguchi.

Playing career
Nakayama was born in Shimonoseki on September 15, 1981. After graduating from high school, he joined J1 League club Sanfrecce Hiroshima in 2000. However, he could hardly play in the match until 2002 and the club was relegated to J2 League from 2003. In summer 2003, he became a regular player and the club was promoted to J1 from 2004. However, he could not play many matches in 2004. In 2005, he moved to J2 club Consadole Sapporo. He became a regular player in 2006. Although his opportunity to play decreased in 2006, he became a regular player again in 2007 and the club won the champions and was promoted to J1 from 2008. Although he played many matches as regular player in 2008, the club was relegated to J2 in a year. In 2009, his opportunity to play decreased and played many matches as substitute forward. In 2010, he moved to newly was promoted to J1 club, Shonan Bellmare. However, he could hardly play in the match for injury in May. In 2011, he moved to Regional Leagues club Renofa Yamaguchi based in his home prefecture. He retired end of 2012 season.

Club statistics

References

External links

1981 births
Living people
Association football people from Yamaguchi Prefecture
Japanese footballers
J1 League players
J2 League players
Sanfrecce Hiroshima players
Hokkaido Consadole Sapporo players
Shonan Bellmare players
Renofa Yamaguchi FC players
Japanese football managers
Renofa Yamaguchi FC managers
Association football forwards